The 1925-26 Swiss Cup was the first season of Switzerland's annual cup competition.  The competition began on 6 September 1925 and ended on 11 April 1926.  Grasshopper Club Zurich defeated FC Bern 2-1 in the Final.

Swiss Cup seasons
1925–26 domestic association football cups
1925–26 in Swiss football